Caribbean Gardens was a  market, gardens and amusement park located in the outer eastern suburb of Scoresby in Melbourne, Australia, on the north/west side of Caribbean Lake, a large -long artificial lake along the northern (right) bank of Corhanwarrabul Creek, a major tributary of Dandenong Creek.

Caribbean Gardens and Market operated from 1965 when it started with water ski shows and a handful of traders selling wares from their car boots. What once was "a handful of traders" grew into a bustling undercover market with over 1000 stall sites. It was known as one of the largest markets in Victoria, occupying a  pavilion.

On the 1 July 2020, it was announced that the park would close permanently, after COVID-19 lockdowns forced a temporary closure which greatly affected the park financially. Despite the closure, Caribbean Market supporters called for the "institution" to be saved. After the official announcement, the Caribbean Market Facebookpage attracted over 5000 comments in support.

The Spooner family subsequently announced plans to expand and transform the mostly defunct market into a business park that would "become the largest office precinct outside of the CBD". The comprehensive masterplan of the new "Caribbean Park" involved new office buildings, expansive lakeside parklands, integrated landscaping, new retail areas, lifestyle facilities, and a Hyatt Place hotel, with the aim of adding a minimum of 10,000 new trees within the parklands every year.

History

 
In 1958, whilst overseas, Arch Spooner discovered fibreglass and realised the potential of the material for the boatbuilding industry, and established the Caribbean Boat Factory. It soon became necessary to have a waterbody large enough for testing the boats and, in the early 1960s, Lake Caribbean was constructed. It was subsequently opened to the public and further developed by one of his sons, Rod Spooner, as Caribbean Gardens. The much-loved Caribbean Gardens and Market opened in 1976 and, in the 1980s, the next generation of the Spooner family began developing a technology and office park that blended into the surrounding environment.

The site was significant for being Victoria's "first local example" of a theme park, with many original features, such as Japanese gardens, a railway, chairlift, jungle cruise and  picnic areas.

The Woman's Weekly noted in 1966 that the Spooner family "aims to turn the area into a kind of local Disneyland, and already the shores and many islets at one end of the lake are dotted with fibreglass crocodiles, elephants, hippopotamuses". The park also included "ski kite-riding from the Cypress Gardens" in the US.

The chairlift ride was built by Jack Griffiths and chairlift manufacturer Ron McCallum, and was originally in Whistlestop Amusement Park, in Skye Road, Frankston, which had closed in 1974.

Caribbean Gardens also had a preserved sugarcane railway locomotive, built in 1924, from the Victoria Mill, Ingham, Queensland. Other features included cast iron street lamps, originally used in central Melbourne, dotted around the gardens.

See also
 Parks and gardens of Melbourne
 Lakes and reservoirs of Melbourne

References

External links
 

Retail markets in Melbourne
1965 establishments in Australia
2020 disestablishments in Australia
Amusement parks in Victoria (Australia)
City of Knox